Skovshoved Idrætsforening, or Skovshoved IF, is a Danish sports club. The football team is currently playing in the Danish 2nd Divisions. They play at Skovshoved Idrætspark  (also referred to as Banen ved Krøyersvej) in Klampenborg north of Copenhagen. Skovshoved IF's most prominent time was earning silver medals in the 1926–27 and 1952–53 seasons of the Danish football championship. The badminton team of SIF was three times national champion.

Honours 
Danish Football Championship
Runners-up (2): 1926–27, 1952–53
Danish Cup
Round of 16 (4): 1954–55, 1959–60, 1991–92, 1997–98
Provinsmesterskabsturneringen
Winners (1): 1926–27
Runners-up (1): 1928
Zealand Football Championship
Winners (5): 1921–22, 1925–26, 1926–27, 1927–28, 1928–29
Runners-up (1): 1924–25
Copenhagen Football Championship
Winners (4): 1939–40, 1941–42, 1946–47, 1969
Runners-up (5): 1937–38, 1940–41, 2004, 2010–11, 2015–16
 Forstadsklubbernes Pokalturnering
Runners-up (1): 1919
‡: Honour achieved by reserve team

Football Achievements 
 11 seasons in the Highest Danish League
 9 seasons in the Second Highest Danish League
 16 seasons in the Third Highest Danish League

References

External links
  Official site

 
1909 establishments in Denmark
Association football clubs established in 1909
Football clubs in Denmark
Football clubs in Copenhagen
Sport in Gentofte Municipality